Weissenberg or Weißenberg may refer to:

Weißenberg, a town in Saxony, Germany
the scene of the Battle of White Mountain
Weißenberg (Frankenweide), a hill in Rhineland-Pfalz, Germany

People with the surname
Alexis Weissenberg (1929-2012), Bulgarian-born French pianist
Carola Weißenberg (1962), German figure skater
Isaac Meir Weissenberg (1881-1938), Yiddish short story writer
Joseph Weißenberg (1855-1941), German religious and social reformer
Karl Weissenberg (1893-1976), German physicist and founding rheologist
Samuel Weissenberg (1867), Russian-Jewish anthropologist
Sophie Weißenberg (1997), German multi-discipline athlete

See also
Weissenberg effect and Weissenberg number, both named after Karl Weissenberg
 Weissenberge
 Weissenberger (disambiguation)
 Weissenburg (disambiguation)

German-language surnames